M'Boki Airport  is an airport serving Obo and Mboki, a village in the Haut-Mbomou prefecture of the Central African Republic.

See also

Transport in the Central African Republic
List of airports in the Central African Republic

References

External links 
OpenStreetMap - M'Boki Airport
OurAirports - M'Boki Airport
FallingRain - M'Boki Airport

Airports in the Central African Republic
Buildings and structures in Haut-Mbomou